"The Baby" is a song written by Michael White and Harley Allen and recorded by American country music singer Blake Shelton. It was released in October 2002 as the first single from Shelton's album The Dreamer. The song became Shelton's second number one hit on the US Billboard Hot Country Singles and Tracks chart in early 2003, and held that position for three weeks.

Content
The song describes how a mother thinks of her children, especially the narrator. He describes being the youngest child in his family, and tells of various situations where he is referred to as "the baby" of the family. Later on, the narrator tells of receiving a telephone call to come to the family's home state of Louisiana, where his mother is dying (it is unclear whether she was in a local hospital or if she was at the family house under hospice care); however, he arrives shortly after she is pronounced dead. The narrator then laments the passing of his mother, stating "I softly kissed that lady / And cried just like a baby."

Music video

The video shows Shelton singing in a room with blue screens while watching flashbacks of his life and family. The roll of film also shows flashbacks and pictures of the narrator and his family. It was directed by Peter Zavadil.

Chart performance
The song debuted at No. 48 on the Hot Country Singles & Tracks chart dated November 2, 2002. It spent 24 weeks on that chart, and became his second Number One single on the chart dated February 22, 2003, holding the top spot for three weeks. It peaked at 28 on the Billboard Hot 100.

Year-end charts

References

External links
Lyrics at CMT.com

2002 singles
Blake Shelton songs
Songs written by Harley Allen
Songs written by Michael White (singer)
Music videos directed by Peter Zavadil
Warner Records Nashville singles
2002 songs